Geoffrey Wolff (born 1937) is an American novelist, essayist, biographer, and travel writer. Among his honors and recognition are the Award in Literature of the American Academy of Arts and Letters (1994) and fellowships of the National Endowment for the Arts, the American Academy in Berlin (2007), and the Guggenheim Foundation. His younger brother  Tobias Wolff is also an award-winning writer.

Biography 

Geoffrey Wolff was born in Hollywood, California, as the first son to "Duke" Arthur Samuels and Rosemary Wolff. He is the older brother of the novelist and memoirist Tobias Wolff. Their parents separated when Geoffrey was twelve, his brother living with their mother, and Geoffrey with their father; their parents eventually divorced. He has described the adventure of his upbringing with his father on the East Coast in an acclaimed memoir, The Duke of Deception (1979), which was runner-up for the Pulitzer Prize. (Tobias has treated with similar candor his own years with their mother in a memoir, This Boy's Life, published in 1989.)

Geoffrey Wolff was educated at the Choate School, graduating in 1955; at Princeton, graduating summa cum laude in 1960; and at Churchill College, Cambridge University. He has taught at Robert College (now Boğaziçi University) in Istanbul, Turkey; at Princeton, and at the University of California, Irvine. There he was professor of English and comparative literature and, from 1995 to 2006, director of the influential Graduate Fiction Program. He has also been a book editor at the Washington Post and at Newsweek.

Wolff is the author of six novels; biographies of Harry Crosby, John O'Hara, and Joshua Slocum; a volume of essays, and other works of non-fiction in several genres. He has edited a selection of Edward Hoagland's writings. He lives in Bath, Maine, with his wife Priscilla.

Partial bibliography

Novels 

Bad Debts (1969)
The Sightseer (1974)
Inklings (1977)
Providence (1985)
The Final Club (1990), set at Princeton University
The Age of Consent (1995)

Non-fiction 

The Edge of Maine (2005), a travel portrait
The Duke of Deception: Memories of My Father (1979), a memoir
A Day at the Beach: Recollections (1992), essays

Biographies 

Black Sun: The Brief Transit and Violent Eclipse of Harry Crosby (1976)
The Art of Burning Bridges: A Life of John O'Hara (2003)
The Hard Way Around: The Passages of Joshua Slocum (2010)

As editor 

 The Edward Hoagland Reader (1979)

References

External links
 UCI Faculty Profile

1937 births
Living people
Writers from Maine
Alumni of Churchill College, Cambridge
American people of Jewish descent